The Fenêtre de Durand is an Alpine pass connecting Switzerland and Italy. It connects Fionnay (in Valais) on its northern side to Valpelline (in the Aosta Valley) on its southern side. The pass is traversed by a trail.

The pass is located between Mont Avril (west) and Mont Gelé (east).

References

External links
 Fenêtre de Durand on Hikr

Mountain passes of Switzerland
Mountain passes of Italy
Mountain passes of the Alps
Mountain passes of Valais
Mountain passes of Aosta Valley
Italy–Switzerland border crossings